The EY Tower (formerly known as the Ernst & Young Tower and 100 Adelaide Street West) is a skyscraper in Toronto, Ontario, Canada at 100 Adelaide Street West. The building was designed by Kohn Pedersen Fox and WZMH Architects.

Original site 
At its 1928 opening, 100 Adelaide Street West, was the Concourse Building which was a 14-story Art Deco structure. The building tenant was the Toronto Industrial Commission, which promoted the city as a hub of finance and business in Ontario. The building was famous for its mosaics by Group of Seven member J.E.H. MacDonald. The Concourse was designed by the firm of Baldwin and Greene. Oxford Properties took control of the building in 1998 and released plans to replace the Concourse Building with a new tower. The Concourse's defenders tried to find a buyer for the building, though Oxford refused to sell the site.

The decision to demolish the Concourse Building was controversial, but the Toronto and East York community councils ultimately voted in favor of the demolition in May 2000, with a vote of 38 to 12.

New building 

Oxford released plans for the new building on 17 June 2013. The new proposal also announced that the building would be renamed from 100 Adelaide Street West, the street address of the site, to Ernst & Young Tower. Ernst and Young, the primary tenant of the new building, will be leasing  of office space.

The base of the new tower includes the south and east walls of the original Concourse Building and is integrated into the PATH as part of Oxford's Richmond-Adelaide Centre. The main tenants of the building are Ernst & Young, OMERS and TMX Group. In addition to a new public space and renovated entrance through the Concourse Building, the tower also features a  outdoor terrace on the 14th floor. The building is LEED Platinum certified. The building was completed in 2017.

Construction 
After many stages of planning, the tower's construction started in July 2014.   The Tower was topped-out in June 2016 and opened in May 2017.

See also 
Ernst & Young
Richmond-Adelaide Centre

References

External links 
100 Adelaide Street West, Oxford Properties
Ernst & Young Tower on Emporis

Skyscrapers in Toronto
Buildings and structures in Toronto
PATH (Toronto)
Kohn Pedersen Fox buildings
WZMH Architects buildings
Skyscraper office buildings in Canada
Retail buildings in Canada